K II was a unique patrol submarine  of the Royal Netherlands Navy. The ship was built by Fijenoord shipyard in Rotterdam.

Service history
The submarine was laid down in Rotterdam at the shipyard of Fijenoord on November 20, 1915. The launch took place on February 27, 1919. On March 28, 1922 K II was commissioned in the Dutch navy.

On board K II  was professor F.A. Vening Meinesz who conducted gravity measurements. He left the ship in Colombo. The ships where delayed when Pelikaan ran aground at Tunis.

On December 11, 1923 the ships arrived at Sabang where they stayed until December 7. On December 7, they set sail for Tanjung Priok where they arrived at December 24, 1923.

The boat was decommissioned in August 1937.

References

External links
Description of ship

1919 ships
Ships built in Schiedam
Submarines of the Royal Netherlands Navy
Submarines built by Maatschappij voor Scheeps- en Werktuigbouw Fijenoord